The Unfair Terms in Consumer Contracts Directive 93/13/EEC is a European Union directive (then called European Economic Community directive) governing the use of surprising or onerous terms used by business in deals with consumers.

National law
In the United Kingdom the Unfair Terms in Consumer Contracts Regulations 1994 and the Unfair Terms in Consumer Contracts Regulations 1999 are UK statutory instruments, which implement the EU Unfair Consumer Contract Terms Directive.

See also
Unfair Terms in Consumer Contracts Regulations 1999 (SI 1999/2083)
English contract law
EU law
OFT v Abbey National plc

Notes

External links
Official text of Council Directive 93/13/EEC of 5 April 1993 on unfair terms in consumer contracts

English contract law
European Union directives
1993 in law
1993 in the European Union